The Presidential Chancellery of Austria is an institution that assists the President with fulfilling his tasks as head of state.
It is headquartered in the Leopoldine Wing of the Hofburg. The Chancellery is divided into several groups: group European and international affairs, protocol and organisation, group legal, social and administrative affairs and the group domestic affairs and adjutant's office of the President.

References

External links
 Office of the President in German
 The Federal President - in English
 van-der-bellen-takes-office as austrian-president

Government of Austria